

The Dätwyler 1038 MDC Trailer was a 1960s Swiss glider tug variant of the American Piper PA-18 Super Cub.

Development
Dätwyler had experience converting a number of war-surplus Piper Cubs for the civilian market. He used this experience to create a single-seat glider tug variant, using the wings, tail unit and landing gear from the post-war Super Cub, mated to his newly designed fuselage. Powered by a Franklin flat six piston engine, it first flew in 1960. Only one was built.

Specifications

References

Notes

Bibliography

Further reading
 

1960s Swiss civil utility aircraft
Glider tugs
Single-engined tractor aircraft
High-wing aircraft
Aircraft first flown in 1962